The 1978–79 Sussex County Football League season was the 54th in the history of Sussex County Football League a football competition in England.

Division One

Division One featured 14 clubs which competed in the division last season, along with two new clubs, promoted from Division Two:
Sidley United
Steyning

League table

Division Two

Division Two featured twelve clubs which competed in the division last season, along with two new clubs relegated from Division One:
Selsey
Wigmore Athletic

League table

References

1978-79
1978–79 in English football leagues